Siracusaville is a census-designated place (CDP) in St. Mary Parish, Louisiana, United States. The population was 422 at the 2010 census. It is part of the Morgan City Micropolitan Statistical Area.

Geography
Siracusaville is located at  (29.68715, -91.14186), adjacent to the eastern border of Morgan City. Louisiana State Route 182 is an east-west road that passes through the southern part of the community, along the edge of Bayou Boeuf, part of the Intracoastal Waterway. U.S. Route 90, a four-lane expressway, forms the northeastern border of the CDP but provides no direct access to it; the closest exits are Exit 176 in Morgan City to the west and Exit 181 in Amelia to the east.

Demographics

References

Census-designated places in Louisiana
Census-designated places in St. Mary Parish, Louisiana